Ilaz Zylfiu (born 27 March 1998) is a Serbian professional footballer of Albanian descent who plays as a second striker for Kosovan club Dukagjini.

Club career

Radnik Surdulica
Born in Miratovac, a small town in the municipality of Preševo as a member of Albanian ethnic group, Zylfiu started playing football at the age of 10. He was playing with football club Lugina, based in Aliđerce, until he joined Radnik Surdulica as a youngster. After almost two years with youth team, Zylfiu signed a one-year scholarship contract with Radnik in February 2017. He was also loaned on dual registration to the Serbian League East side Pukovac, making six appearances until the end of the 2016–17 campaign.

In summer 2017, Zylfiu joined the first team of Radnik Surdulica under coach Simo Krunić, but moved on new loan deal to Ozren Sokobanja shortly after. He scored his premier goal for the first season victory of Ozren over Timok on 16 September 2017. After the whole first-half season in the third-ranked league, a loan deal was terminated and Zylfiu returned to Radnik ending of November same year.

On 29 November 2017. Zylfiu made his official debut for Radnik Surdulica, replacing Miloš Stanković in 69 minute of the Serbian SuperLiga match against Red Star Belgrade. He has been reported as the first Albanian footballer in the club history since finding in 1926. In February 2018, Zylfiu signed his first four-your professional contract with Radnik, after which he extended his loan deal to Ozren until the end of 2017–18 campaign.

Returning from loan deal in summer 2018, Zylfiu started new season preparing under coach Mladen Dodić, but after being excluded from the 2018–19 Serbian SuperLiga player list, Zylfiu mutually terminated the contract and left Radnik as a free agent on the last day of July same year, along with teammate Krsta Đorđević.

Playing style
Zulfiu is a 1.67 m high attacker, who usually plays as a second striker or attacking midfielder. He is characterized by speed and lucidity, affirmed as a goalscorer in the Serbian League East. He has also promoted himself as a free kick taker, scoring in a match against Jedinstvo Paraćin. He is often compared with Fadil Vokrri, a former Kosovo Albanian football forward.

Career statistics

References

External links

1998 births
Living people
People from Preševo
Serbian footballers
Albanians in Serbia
Association football forwards
Serbian SuperLiga players
FK Radnik Surdulica players
Football Superleague of Kosovo players
KF Flamurtari players
Kategoria Superiore players
KF Laçi players